Alf Reidar Jacobsen (born 21 February 1950) is a Norwegian journalist, non-fiction writer, novelist, crime fiction writer and biographer. 

Jacobsen was born in Hammerfest. He has worked as a journalist for the newspapers Finnmark Dagblad, Klassekampen, Verdens Gang, for the magazine Økonomisk Rapport, and for the Norwegian Broadcasting Corporation. 

He was awarded the Riverton Prize in 1988 for the novel Kharg. His book Iskyss from 1991, on Soviet espionage in Norway, earned him the SKUP Award, and was the basis for a film in 2008. He published a biography of the whaler Svend Foyn in 2008. 

His book Kongens nei was the basis for the 2016 film The King's Choice.

References

1950 births
People from Hammerfest
Norwegian journalists
20th-century Norwegian novelists
21st-century Norwegian novelists
Norwegian non-fiction writers
Norwegian military writers
Norwegian crime fiction writers
Norwegian biographers
Living people
Verdens Gang people
NRK people
Norwegian investigative journalists